Broadmoor Hospital is a high-security psychiatric hospital in Crowthorne, Berkshire, England. It is the oldest of England's three high-security psychiatric hospitals, the other two being Ashworth Hospital near Liverpool and Rampton Secure Hospital in Nottinghamshire. The hospital's catchment area consists of four National Health Service regions: London, Eastern, South East and South West. It is managed by the West London NHS Trust.

History 

The hospital was first known as the Broadmoor Criminal Lunatic Asylum.  Completed in 1863, it was built to a design by Sir Joshua Jebb, an officer of the Corps of Royal Engineers, and covered  within its secure perimeter.

The first patient was a female admitted for infanticide on 27 May 1863. Notes described her as being 'feeble minded'. It has been suggested by an analysis of her records that she most likely had congenital syphilis. The first male patients arrived on 27 February 1864. The original building plan of five blocks (four for men and one for women) was completed in 1868. An additional male block was built in 1902.

Due to overcrowding at Broadmoor, an extending asylum branch was constructed at Rampton Secure Hospital and opened in 1912. Rampton was closed as a branch asylum at the end of 1919 and reopened as an institution for "mental defectives" rather than lunatics. During the First World War Broadmoor's block 1 was also used as a Prisoner-of-war camp, called Crowthorne War Hospital, for mentally ill German soldiers.

After the escape in 1952 of John Straffen, who murdered a local child, the hospital set up an alarm system, which is activated to alert people in the vicinity, as well as the public including those in the surrounding towns of Sandhurst, Wokingham, Bracknell, Camberley and Bagshot, when any potentially dangerous patient escapes. It is based on Second World War air raid sirens, and a two-tone alarm sounds across the whole area in the event of an escape. Until 2018, it was tested every Monday morning at 10 am for two minutes, after which a single tone 'all-clear' was sounded for a further two minutes. All schools in the area must keep procedures designed to ensure that in the event of a Broadmoor escape no child is ever out of the direct supervision of a member of staff. Sirens were located at Sandhurst School, Wellington College, Bracknell Forest Council depot and other sites until they were decommissioned upon the opening of the hospital's new site.

Following the Peter Fallon QC inquiry into Ashworth Special Hospital which reported in 1999, and found serious concerns about security and abuses resulting from poor management, it was decided to review the security at all three of the special hospitals in England. Until this time each was responsible for maintaining its own security policies. This review was made the personal responsibility of Sir Alan Langlands, who at the time was chief executive of the NHS England. The report that came out of the review initiated a new partnership whereby the Department of Health sets out a policy of safety, and security directions, that all three special hospitals must adhere to.

In 2003, the Commission for Healthcare Improvement declared the Victorian buildings at Broadmoor Hospital 'unfit for purpose'.

In 2018 the hospital was rated as Good overall by the Care Quality Commission.

Therapies
Broadmoor uses both psychiatric medication and psychotherapy, as well as occupational therapy. One of the therapies available is the arts, and patients are encouraged to participate in the Koestler Awards Scheme. One of the longest-detained patients at Broadmoor is Albert Haines, who set a legal precedent in 2011 when his mental health tribunal hearing was allowed to be fully public; he argued there that he had never been given the type of counselling he had always sought, and the panel urged the clinicians to work more collaboratively and clearly towards his psychiatric rehabilitation.

The nature of the facility
Because of its high walls and other visible security features, and the news reporting it has received in the past, the hospital is often assumed to be a prison by members of the public. Many of its patients are sent to it via the criminal justice system, and its original design brief incorporated an essence of addressing criminality in addition to mental illness. Nearly all staff are members of the Prison Officers' Association, as opposed to other health service unions such as UNISON and the Royal College of Nursing.

Governance

Historical governance
The first medical superintendent was John Meyer. His assistant, William Orange, succeeded him. Orange established "a management style that was greatly admired". He also advised the Home Office on how to approach criminal insanity. Orange was in charge from 1870 to 1886.

From its opening, until 1948, Broadmoor was managed by a council of supervision, appointed by and reporting to the Home Secretary. Thereafter, the Criminal Justice Act of 1948 transferred ownership of the hospital to the Department of Health (and the newly formed NHS) and oversight to the Board of Control for Lunacy and Mental Deficiency established under the Mental Deficiency Act 1913. It also renamed the hospital Broadmoor Institution. The hospital remained under direct control of the Department of Health – a situation that reportedly "combined notional central control with actual neglect" – until the establishment of the Special Hospitals Service Authority in 1989, with Charles Kaye as its first chief executive.

Alan Franey ran the hospital from 1989 to 1997, having been recommended for the post by his friend Jimmy Savile. His leadership was undermined by persistent rumours of sexual impropriety on the hospital grounds. Allegedly he ignored at least three sexual assaults that he had been informed about.

The Special Hospitals Service Authority was abolished in 1996, being replaced by individual special health authorities in each of the high-security hospitals. The Broadmoor Hospital Authority was itself dissolved on 31 March 2001.

Current governance
On 1 April 2001, West London Mental Health (NHS) Trust took over the responsibility for the hospital. The trust reports to the NHS Executive through NHS England London. The former director, who then became the CEO of the trust, quit in 2009 after Healthcare Commission/Care Quality Commission findings of serious failures to ensure patient safety at Broadmoor. In 2014 the director of specialist and forensic services resigned (and was employed elsewhere in the NHS) just prior to the conclusions of an investigation into a bullying culture. The next permanent CEO retired in 2015 in the wake of poor Care Quality Commission findings and other problems in the Trust.

A new head of security was appointed in March 2013, John Hourihan, who had thirty years' experience at Scotland Yard and had worked as a bodyguard for members of the royal family.

Meanwhile, the trust allowed ITV to film a two-part documentary within Broadmoor in 2014. Press releases stated that on average there are four 'assaults' per week on staff. Psychiatrist Amlan Basu, clinical director of Broadmoor since March 2014, promoted the documentary but then decided to leave the NHS in 2015 amidst funding and staffing problems, despite the trust having just highlighted investment in his skills through its 'prestigious initiative to improve the quality of patient care in the NHS.'

Buildings 

Much of Broadmoor's architecture is still Victorian, including the gatehouse, which has a clock tower.

Following long-standing reports that the old buildings were unfit for purpose (for therapy or safety), planning permission was granted in 2012 for a £242 million redevelopment, involving a new unit comprising 10 wards to adjoin the existing 6 wards of the modern Paddock Unit, resulting in total bed numbers of 234. Building company Kier reported in 2013 a sum of £115 million for the new unit of 162 beds, ready to accept patients by the start of 2017, and £43 million for a separate new medium secure unit for men nearby.

A new unit called the Paddock Centre already opened on 12 December 2005 to contain and treat patients classed as having a 'dangerous severe personality disorder' (DSPD). This was a new and much debated category invented on behalf of the UK government, based on an individual being considered a 'Grave and Immediate Danger' to the general public, and meeting some combination of criteria for personality disorders and/or high scores on the Hare Psychopathy Check list – Revised.

The Paddock Centre was designed to eventually house 72 patients, but never opened more than four of its six 12-bedded wards. The Department of Health and Ministry of Justice National Personality Disorder Strategy published in October 2011 concluded that the resources invested in the DSPD programme should instead be used in prison based treatment programmes and the DSPD service at Broadmoor was required to close by 31 March 2012.

The trust took possession of the first phase of the new buildings, with 16 wards and 234 beds, in May 2019.

Misconduct by staff

Abuse

From at least 1968 the television presenter and disc jockey Jimmy Savile undertook voluntary work at the hospital and was allocated his own room, supported by Broadmoor CEO Pat McGrath, who thought it would be good publicity.

In 1987 a minister in the Department of Health and Social Security (DHSS), Baroness Trumpington, appointed Savile to the management board in charge of Broadmoor. He was being referred to as 'Dr Savile' by both the DHSS and Broadmoor despite having no medical qualifications or training, having left school at the age of 14. In August 1988, following a recommendation by Cliff Graham, the senior civil servant in charge of mental health at the DHSS, Savile was appointed by the department's health minister Edwina Currie to chair an interim task force overseeing the management of the hospital following the suspension of its board. Currie privately supported Savile's attempts to 'blackmail' the Prison Officers Association and publicly declared her 'full confidence' in him.

After an ITV1 documentary Exposure: The Other Side of Jimmy Savile in October 2012, allegations of sexual abuse by Savile were made or re-made by former patients and staff. The civil servant who first proposed Savile's appointment to the task force at Broadmoor, Brian McGinnis, who ran the mental health division of the DHSS in 1987 before Cliff Graham, has since been investigated by police and prevented from working with children.

A Department of Health investigation led by former barrister Kate Lampard into Savile's activities at Broadmoor and other hospitals and facilities in England, with Bill Kirkup leading the Broadmoor aspects, reported in 2014 that Savile had use of a personal set of keys to Broadmoor from 1968 to 2004 (not formally revoked until 2009), with full unsupervised access to some wards. Eleven allegations of sexual abuse were known; this is thought to be a substantial under-estimate, due to how psychiatric patients in particular were disbelieved or put off from coming forward. In five cases the identity of the alleged victim could not be traced, but of the other six it was concluded they had all been abused by Savile, repeatedly in the case of two patients.

The investigation also concluded that 'the institutional culture in Broadmoor was previously inappropriately tolerant of staff–patient sexual relationships,' and that when there were female patients they were required to undress and bathe in front of staff and sometimes visitors. A 'shocking' failure to ensure a safe or therapeutic environment for female patients had already been revealed in a 2002 inquiry prior to Broadmoor becoming male-only.

In 2010 a female charge nurse received a suspended prison sentence for engaging in sexual activity with a patient at the hospital.

Violating patient confidentiality
Journalists invading the privacy of patients or reporting false information about them have been the subject of dozens of complaints from Broadmoor. Healthcare assistant Robert Neave took payments from The Sun for several years to provide them with information, including copies of psychiatric reports; this was subsequently investigated by Operation Elveden. Mental health nurse Kenneth Hall was imprisoned in June 2015 for having repeatedly sold stories to the tabloids based on stolen medical notes and fabricated documents.

Former and current patients

Michael Adebowale, Islamic terrorist who was one of two men convicted for the murder of Lee Rigby in 2013.
Haroon Rashid Aswat, jihadist wanted by the United States.
Antony Baekeland, great-grandson of Leo Baekeland, who stabbed his mother to death
William Rutherford Benn, father of Dame Margaret Rutherford
Peter Bryan, serial killer and cannibal who killed an inmate 10 days after being admitted
Sharon Carr, who at age 12 became Britain's youngest female murderer
David Copeland, who killed three people with homemade nail bombs
Richard Dadd, artist
Gregory Davis, spree killer
James Kelly, who escaped from the hospital in 1888 after having murdered his wife, and is a Jack the Ripper suspect proposed by later theorists.
Christiana Edmunds, the 'Chocolate Cream Poisoner'
Ibrahim Eidarous, alleged member of al-Jihad
Kenneth Erskine, serial killer
Frankie Fraser, gangster
June and Jennifer Gibbons, known as the silent twins
Daniel Gonzalez, spree killer
 Ronald Kray, one of the Kray twins
Thomas John Ley, politician and murderer committed after a case known as the Chalk Pit Murder
Robert Maudsley, serial killer who tortured and murdered an inmate in the hospital over a period of 9 hours
Roderick Maclean, poet who attempted to assassinate Queen Victoria
William Chester Minor, amateur lexicographer known as the Surgeon of Crowthorne
Daniel M'Naghten, Scottish wood-turner and assassin
Robert Napper, serial killer
Edward Oxford, barman who attempted to assassinate Queen Victoria
Richard Archer Prince, actor and murderer
Nicky Reilly, failed suicide attacker
 Damian Rzeszowski, family murderer
Charles Salvador, armed robber, born Michael Peterson and formerly known as Charles Bronson
Nicholas Salvador, convicted of killing Palmira Silva
John Straffen, serial killer who escaped and killed a young girl some hours later
Peter Sutcliffe, serial killer known as the 'Yorkshire Ripper', survived multiple attempts on his life from other inmates
Roy Shaw, gangster
Ronald True, murderer
Robert Torto, who claimed to be the son of God after killing two men
Callum Wheeler, moved from HM Prison Belmarsh whilst on remand for the murder of Kent PCSO Julia James in April 2021.
Barry Williams, spree killer
Graham Young, serial killer

See also
Ashworth high security hospital
Forensic psychiatry
Bethlem Royal Hospital

References

Further reading
 Dewey Class 365/.942294 19. Sum: authors describe the treatment of some Broadmoor patients and together with their psychiatric and criminal histories.

The Sainsbury Centre for Mental Health (2006).First steps to work – a study at Broadmoor Hospital (119KB). Accessed 2007-06-15
 Broadmoor Revealed. Accessed 2011-07-15

External links 

 
 Inspection reports from the Care Quality Commission
 Berkshire Record Office's Broadmoor History pages Accessed 2011-04-18
 Fallon, Peter; Bluglass, Robert; Edwards, Brian; Daniels, Granville (January 1999) Report of the Committee of Inquiry into the Personality Disorder Unit, Ashworth Special Hospital. published by The Stationery Office. Accessed 2007-11-12
Home Office. National offenders management service. Dangerous People with Severe Personality Disorder Programme. Accessed 2007-06-07
All in the mind (Wednesday 3 March 2004, 5.00 pm). BBC – Live chat: The rehabilitation of the mentally ill in Broadmoor and elsewhere. Accessed 2007-05-19
background on Broadmoor Hospital, BBC News
Landscapes & Gardens (2002) Architectural listing for Broadmoor Hospital. University of York. Accessed 2007-05-19
BBC News story on scandals and controversy regarding Broadmoor and other secure hospitals
Together-UK Independent Patients' Advocacy Service, for Broadmoor Hospital. Accessed 2007-06-15
Fallon, Peter; Bluglass, Robert; Edwards, Brian; Daniels, Granville (January 1999) – overview of the History of the Hospitals in the context of the Ashworth Inquiry Ashworth Special Hospital: Report of the Committee of Inquiry Accessed June 2008

Hospitals established in 1863
Buildings and structures in Berkshire
Hospitals in Berkshire
Bracknell Forest
Jimmy Savile
NHS hospitals in England
Psychiatric hospitals in England
1863 establishments in England